Goladara is a village in Vagra Block of Bharuch district in Gujarat State of India. Panchayat name is Goladar. It is 33 km from Bharuch, district headquarters.

References

Villages in Bharuch district